Ƃ (minuscule: ƃ) is a letter of the Latin alphabet. It is similar to the Cyrillic Б б in appearance. A very similar glyph has also sometimes been used for the uppercase form of Ɓ ɓ, for example in Shona.

It was used in the Zhuang alphabet from 1957 to 1986, when it was replaced by the digraph mb.

In upside-down text, the letter in lowercase form is often used as a substitute for turned g (for its wider availability in fonts such as Verdana Ref and Georgia than other substitutes, such as the real Unicode turned-g and another substitute, Ɓ).

It first appeared in Unicode version 1.1.0 in June 1993.  It is referred to a 'B' with a top bar the Caribbean languages.

See also
Ƌ ƌ

References 

Latin-script letters